Thelma Anne Taylor (December 12, 1933 – August 6, 1949) was an American teenager who was abducted and murdered in Portland, Oregon in 1949, after having disappeared on August 5. Her body was discovered the following week, on August 11. Taylor's murder received national attention and became a cause célèbre. The perpetrator, Morris Leland, was executed in 1953. The site of the murder in St. Johns occurred underneath the St. Johns Bridge, on land that is now in Cathedral Park.

Disappearance and murder
On August 5, 1949, Thelma Taylor, a 15-year-old sophomore at Roosevelt High School, was waiting for a bus in the St. Johns neighborhood in northern Portland, Oregon, intending to travel to the nearby town of Hillsboro to get a summer job picking beans.

While Taylor was waiting for the bus, she was accosted by Morris Leland, a 22-year-old ex-convict, who asked her to accompany him to a spot by the Willamette River under the St. Johns Bridge, in the nearby Cathedral Park neighborhood. Upon arriving at the secluded area, Leland held Taylor captive and attempted to rape her, but desisted upon finding that she was a virgin. The two slept that night beneath the St. Johns Bridge, which at the time was undeveloped and full of thick underbrush.

On the morning of August 6, Taylor began screaming for help after hearing workers switching train cars at a nearby train yard. Leland then killed Taylor by bludgeoning her on the head with a steel bar multiple times and stabbed her with a knife. He then threw the steel bar and the knife into the river, wiped his fingerprints off of Taylor's lunch pail, and gathered up his cigarette butts. Leland buried Taylor's body in a shallow grave under a pile of driftwood.

Conviction and execution
In the early morning hours of August 11, 1949, Leland was arrested for automobile theft by the Portland police, and subsequently confessed to kidnapping and murdering Taylor, though he claimed she had gone with him "willingly." On August 19, he was indicted on charges of first-degree murder. At his trial, Leland pleaded not guilty by reason of insanity. His trial began on October 4, 1949, and on November 11, he was convicted of murder and sentenced to death. Leland was initially sentenced to die January 20, 1950, but this date was moved after he filed for a new trial; however, his plea for a new trial was denied on December 18, 1949.

On April 20, 1951, Morris was sentenced to be executed. He was executed by the gas chamber on January 9, 1953, at the Oregon State Penitentiary in Salem, Oregon.

Legacy
Taylor was buried in Columbia Cemetery in the Parkrose neighborhood of Portland. The site of Taylor's murder under the St. Johns Bridge has since been developed into a public park, also called Cathedral Park, opening on May 3, 1980. The murder on the land that became Cathedral Park led to local folklore in the area that the park is supposedly haunted by Taylor.

See also
Crime in Oregon
List of murdered American children
List of solved missing persons cases

References

Sources

1949 in Portland, Oregon
1949 murders in the United States
Deaths by beating in the United States
Deaths by person in Oregon
Deaths by stabbing in Oregon
Missing person cases in Oregon
Murder in Oregon
Capital murder cases
Burials in Oregon
Willamette River
August 1949 events in the United States
Scandals in Oregon
History of women in Oregon
Incidents of violence against girls